Nancy Jo Kassebaum Baker (née Landon; born July 29, 1932) is an American politician who represented the State of Kansas in the United States Senate from 1978 to 1997.  She is the daughter of Alf Landon, who was Governor of Kansas from 1933 to 1937 and the 1936 Republican nominee for president, and the widow of former Senator and diplomat Howard Baker. She was the first woman ever elected to a full term in the Senate without her husband having previously served in Congress. She is also the first woman to have represented Kansas in the Senate. Kassebaum was elected to the American Philosophical Society in 1996.

Early life and education
Baker was born in Topeka, Kansas, the daughter of Kansas First Lady Theo (née Cobb) and Governor Alf Landon. She attended Topeka High School and graduated in 1950. She graduated from the University of Kansas in Lawrence in 1954, where she was a member of Kappa Alpha Theta.  In 1956, she received a master's degree in diplomatic history from the University of Michigan, where she met her first husband, Philip Kassebaum. They married in 1956. They settled in Maize, Kansas, where they raised two children.

She worked as vice president of Kassebaum Communications, a family-owned company that operated several radio stations. Kassebaum also served on the Maize School Board. In 1975, Kassebaum and her husband were legally separated; their divorce became final in 1979. Kassebaum worked in Washington, D.C., as a caseworker for Senator James B. Pearson of Kansas in 1975, but returned to Kansas the following year.

Career

Elections 
She was the first woman ever elected to a full term in the U.S. Senate without her husband having previously served in Congress, and the third woman elected to a Senate seat without it being held first by her husband (following never married Gladys Pyle of South Dakota in 1938, the first woman to enter the Senate through election and first woman to run for both governor and U S Senator and Margaret Chase Smith of Maine was first elected to the House of Representatives to fill her husband's vacancy but later won four Senate elections starting in 1948) or appointed to complete a deceased husband's term. She was also the first woman to represent Kansas in the Senate.

At the time that she entered the race, Kassebaum was legally separated from her husband Philip but not yet divorced. She chose to use the name Nancy Landon Kassebaum to capitalize on the political fame of her father. She defeated eight other Republicans in the 1978 primary elections to replace retiring Republican James B. Pearson and then defeated former Democratic Congressman Bill Roy (who narrowly lost a previous election bid to Kansas's junior senator, Bob Dole, in 1974) in the general election. After her first few years in office, "her maiden name was used less and less as the senator established her own credibility and credentials as a federal lawmaker." For the rest of her political career, she was primarily known as Nancy Kassebaum. She was re-elected to her Senate seat in 1984 and 1990 but did not seek re-election in 1996.

Tenure 
Kassebaum is a moderate-to-liberal Republican who is known for her health care legislation, known as the Kennedy-Kassebaum Health Insurance Portability and Accountability Act, which was co-sponsored by Massachusetts Senator Edward Kennedy, a Democrat. She was also active in foreign policy. She expressed strong support of anti-apartheid measures against South Africa in the 1980s and traveled to Nicaragua as both an election observer and to encourage diplomatic resolutions to the conflict between the Contras and the Sandinistas.

Early in her career, she was tapped to serve as Temporary Chairman of the 1980 Republican National Convention. Presiding over the first two days of the convention, her appointment to that role was seen by many as a nod from the Reagan campaign to the moderate and liberal wings of the party.

Kassebaum voted in favor of the bill establishing Martin Luther King Jr. Day as a federal holiday and the Civil Rights Restoration Act of 1987 (as well as to override President Reagan's veto). Kassebaum voted in favor of the Robert Bork Supreme Court nomination. Kassebaum voted to confirm Clarence Thomas to the Supreme Court in 1991, a vote she would later come to regret, expressing disappointment in his performance. The year after the hearings, she noted, "I was never once asked by anyone at the White House or by any of my colleagues about how I reacted to Anita Hill's public allegations of sexual harassment or how I thought the allegations should be handled."

In 1991, Kassebaum was mentioned by Time magazine as a possible running mate for President George H. W. Bush if Vice President Dan Quayle was not the Republican vice-presidential candidate in the 1992 U.S. presidential election.

Personal life 
Kassebaum is an Advisory Board member for the Partnership for a Secure America, a not-for-profit organization dedicated to recreating the bipartisan center in American national security and foreign policy. She is also a member of the ReFormers Caucus of Issue One.

In 1996, she married former U.S. Senator Howard Baker, Jr. of Tennessee. He died in 2014.

Her son, William Kassebaum, is a former member of the Kansas House of Representatives. Her other son, filmmaker Richard Kassebaum, died of a brain tumor August 27, 2008, at the age of 47. Her daughter, Linda Josephine Kassebaum Johnson, a veterinarian, died December 6, 2020, at age 62. 

As of 2015, she resides at a family ranch near Burdick, Kansas. She is a noted critic of President Donald Trump. In 2018, she, alongside other incumbent and former Republican politicians, endorsed Laura Kelly, the Democratic candidate and eventual victor, in the 2018 Kansas gubernatorial election. Kassebaum also endorsed Republican-turned-Democrat Barbara Bollier for the 2020 Senate election in Kansas over her Republican opponent Roger Marshall. In 2014, Kassebaum expressed support for same-sex marriage.

See also 

Women in the United States Senate

Notes

References

External links 
 Congressional Biography
 
 Kassebaum, Nancy Landon. To Form a More Perfect Union Presidential Studies Quarterly  18 (Spring 1988): 241–49.
 Marshall-White, Eleanor (1991). Catalysts for Change: Interpretive Biographies of Shirley St. Hill Chisholm, Sandra Day O'Connor, and Nancy Landon Kassebaum, Vantage Press, 

|-

|-

|-

1932 births
Living people
American Episcopalians
Commission for Africa members
Female United States senators
Iowa State University faculty
Kansas Republicans
Landon family
Politicians from Topeka, Kansas
School board members in Kansas
Republican Party United States senators from Kansas
University of Kansas alumni
University of Michigan alumni
Women in Kansas politics
20th-century American women politicians
20th-century American politicians
American women academics
21st-century American women
Members of the American Philosophical Society